Medusa is a c.1618 painting by the Flemish painter Peter Paul Rubens, showing the severed head of Medusa. The snakes in the painting have been attributed to Frans Snyders. It is in the collection of the Kunsthistorisches Museum in Vienna. Another version is held in Moravian Gallery in Brno.

References

External links
https://web.archive.org/web/20160303232752/http://bilddatenbank.khm.at/viewArtefact?id=1626

Mythological paintings by Peter Paul Rubens
1618 paintings
Paintings in the collection of the Kunsthistorisches Museum
Paintings depicting Greek myths
Paintings in the Czech Republic
Cultural depictions of Medusa